Craugastor myllomyllon is an extinct species of frog in the family Craugastoridae. It was endemic to Guatemala and only known from its type locality, Finca Volcan, in the Sierra de Xucaneb, Alta Verapaz Department. Only a single specimen is known.

Etymology
The specific name myllomyllon honors Jonathan A. Campbell, an American herpetologist. It relates to the Scottish surname Campbell (meaning "wry lip") through the Greek words myllos ("bent") and myllon ("lip"). Jay M. Savage further notes that "those that know Jonathan well may see a connection between the name and his oral renditions of his Guatemalan adventures".

Description
The snout is rounded in dorsal outline and obtuse (sloping) in lateral view. The tympanum is indistinct. The dorsum is covered with widely spaced moderate-sized tubercles. The fingers have slightly expanded discs and lateral keels; the toe discs that are slightly larger than those on the fingers. The toes have well-developed lateral fringes and moderate webbing. The preserved specimen is dorsally brown, with tips of tubercles and suprascapular and presacral ridges cream-colored. There is an indistinct interorbital bar that is demarcated posteriorly by a narrow dark brown bar. The limbs have weak, dark crossbars. The chin, throat, and venter are pale cream and have scattered melanophores.

Habitat and conservation
Specific threats to this species are unknown, but habitat loss caused by agricultural encroachment is a general threat.

References

myllomyllon
Amphibians of Guatemala
Endemic fauna of Guatemala
Amphibians described in 2000
Taxa named by Jay M. Savage
Taxonomy articles created by Polbot